Oleshky is a town in Kherson Raion, Kherson Oblast, southern Ukraine, located on the left bank of the Dnieper River with the town of Solontsi to the south. It is the oldest city of the oblast and one of the oldest in southern Ukraine. It is known for its proximity to the Oleshky Sands, a large desert region. Oleshky is the site of artist Polina Rayko home, a national cultural monument of Ukraine. Oleshky hosts the administration of Oleshky urban hromada, one of the hromadas of Ukraine. It had a population of

Administrative status 
Until 18 July 2020, Oleshky was the administrative center of Oleshky Raion. The raion was abolished in July 2020 as part of the administrative reform of Ukraine, which reduced the number of raions in Kherson Oblast to five. The area of Oleshky Raion was merged into Kherson Raion.

Geography
The town is located in the south of Ukraine. The Konka River goes through the town before falling into the Dnipro. The Oleshky Sands are located in close proximity to the town.

History
The city of Oleshia has been known since the 11th century, when it was a part of Kyivan Rus, but the area itself has been known since antiquity. Herodotus mentioned Scythian forests in the mouth of the Dnieper in the 5th century BCE, which were called "Oleshye" (from the Slavic word for forest) by the Slavs. The town, which appeared later, took its name from the area, and the later form of the name (Oleshky) is also related.

In 1711–1728, Oleshky was the capital of the Zaporizhian Host under the protection of the Crimean Khanate. In 1784, the settlement of Oleshky was established; by 1790, it became a part of the Kinburn palanka of the Black-Sea Cossacks. In 1802, the settlement was granted town status and became the seat of an uyezd in Taurida Governorate. In 1928, the town was given the name Tsiurupynsk after former Soviet Trade Minister and the chief of Gosplan Alexander Tsiurupa, who was born in the town.

Oleshky was occupied by German troops on September 10, 1941. In late September or early October 1941, some 800 Jews from Oleshky and its vicinity were murdered at a site east of the town. In 1943, the children of mixed marriages between Jews and non-Jews were murdered in Oleshky.

On 21 November 2007, the town council adopted resolution No.296 to restore the name Oleshky. The town council deputies and district councils, as well as the local Cossacks, wrote a letter to then president Victor Yushchenko requesting that the petition be carried out.

It was not until 19 May 2016 that the Verkhovna Rada adopted the resolution to rename Tsiurupynsk as Oleshky and conform to the law prohibiting names of Communist origin after a 9-year campaign by the town's council and residents.

On 24 February, 2022, Oleshky was occupied by Russian forces in the 2022 Russian invasion of Ukraine. On 14 April, 2022, Russian forces removed the flag of Ukraine from the town hall and replaced it with a Russian flag. Russian forces withdrew from Kherson city and the part of the region north of the Dnipro river in November 2022. Ukraine's National Resistance Center reported in December 2022 that all Russian collaborators had left Oleshky.

Gallery

See also 

 List of renamed cities in Ukraine

References

Notes

Sources
Е. М. Поспелов (Ye. M. Pospelov). "Имена городов: вчера и сегодня (1917–1992). Топонимический словарь." (City Names: Yesterday and Today (1917–1992). Toponymic Dictionary.) Москва, "Русские словари", 1993.

External links
Brief history profile 
Information about the city council

Cities in Kherson Oblast
Zaporozhian Sich historic sites
Dneprovsky Uyezd
Cities of district significance in Ukraine
City name changes in Ukraine
Former Soviet toponymy in Ukraine
Populated places on the Dnieper in Ukraine
Rus' settlements